Leo Amy Falcam (November 20, 1935 – February 12, 2018) was a Micronesian political figure. He was born in Pohnpei. He served as the first elected Governor of Pohnpei from 1979 to 1983 and as Vice President of Micronesia from May 1997 to May 1999. He then served as the fifth president of the Federated States of Micronesia, holding the position from May 11, 1999, to May 11, 2003. In March 2003 he lost his parliamentary seat during elections, denying him a chance at a second term.

References

External links
Official biography
Government of FSM Biography of Leo Falcam

1935 births
2018 deaths
People from Pohnpei State
Presidents of the Federated States of Micronesia
Vice presidents of the Federated States of Micronesia
Governors of Pohnpei
Members of the Congress of the Federated States of Micronesia